Edward Kemp (25 September 1817 – 1 March 1891) was an English landscape architect and an author.  Together with Joseph Paxton and Edward Milner, Kemp became one of the leaders in the design of parks and gardens during the mid-Victorian era in England.

Biography
Kemp was born at Streatham, Surrey (now Lambeth), the son of Charles Kemp, a tailor, and his wife, Ann. Nothing is known about his education or early career. In the 1830s he worked with Edward Milner as a garden apprentice at Chatsworth House in Derbyshire under Joseph Paxton. In 1841 Kemp was living back in Streatham, giving his occupation in the census of that year as "gardener".  Around that time he was involved with botanical and gardening publications, including The Gardening Magazine.  In August 1843 the Improvement Commissioners of Birkenhead appointed Paxton to plan and construct Birkenhead Park. This was the first park to have been provided in Britain at public expense. Paxton appointed Kemp to be superintendent of the park, and Kemp took up this post in September 1843 when he was aged 25.  Paxton was responsible for the overall planning and design, while Kemp was involved with the day to day implementation of the plans.  By the summer of 1845 Paxton's work was more or less complete, and he recommended to the Commissioners that Kemp be retained as superintendent and to be provided with a residence; this was accepted.

In September 1845 Kemp took leave of absence to marry Sophia, daughter of Henry Bailey who had been park steward and gardener to the Spencer family at Althorp House.  When Kemp returned to Birkenhead, his work was not fully occupying his time, and he became involved with planning a residential park estate, Carlett Park, at Eastham in the Wirral.  The plans were not realised, and the Commissioners were unhappy that Kemp had become involved in private practice. Birkenhead Park was opened officially in April 1847, and in 1849 the Commissioners decided that a superintendent of parks was no longer required. However Kemp negotiated a settlement that he should work for no salary, but remain in his residence at Italian Lodge plus be given a small plot of land for him to cultivate for his needs.  This was agreed, but Kemp had to find sources of income; this was to result in his becoming an author and a landscape gardener.

Kemp's first recorded commission was in 1849 when he designed a rose garden for James Barratt on the grounds of Lymm Hall, Lymm, Cheshire.  The following year he worked with the architect Charles Verelst to design the garden at Stanacres (now Thornton Court) in Raby.  Also in 1850 came Kemp's first publication, How to Lay Out a Small Garden.  Following this came a succession of garden designs and publications.  In 1858 a second edition of his book was published (now entitled How to Lay Out a Garden) and, although he was still working for the park, the Commissioners reviewed the agreement to provide him with free accommodation.  Kemp then agreed to build a house for himself adjoining the park, and he moved into this house (now 74 Park Road West) in 1860.

Kemp's clients were mainly the newly rich, but he also gained commissions for the designs of parks and cemeteries.  These included Flaybrick Hill Cemetery in Birkenhead, Grosvenor Park in Chester, Congleton Park in Congleton, and Queen's Park in Crewe. Kemp's work influenced other garden designers, including Thomas Hayton Mawson, who designed Hanley Park in Stoke-on-Trent. Kemp died at his home in Birkenhead Park in 1891 and was buried in Flaybrick Cemetery. His estate amounted to nearly £10,500.

Publications

Works

References
Citations

Sources

1817 births
1891 deaths
English gardeners
English landscape architects